A list of Greek painters:

A-E
 Agatharchus
 Bularchus
 Ioannis Altamouras
 Constantine Andreou
 Antiphilus
 Apelles
 Apollodorus
 Aristides of Thebes
 Christodoulos Aronis
 Michael Astrapas and Eutychios
 Tasos Chonias
 Cimon of Cleonae
 Alexandros Christofis
 Giorgio de Chirico
 Hermon di Giovanno
 Dionysius of Fourna
 Echion
 Nikos Engonopoulos
 Euphranor
 Eupompus
 Costas Evangelatos

F-N
 Demetrios Farmakopoulos
 Alekos Fassianos
 Demetrios Galanis
 Angelos Giallinas
 El Greco
 Nikolaos Gyzis
 Nikos Hadjikyriakos-Ghikas
 Theophilos Hatzimihail
 Nikolaos Himonas
 Georgios Jakobides
 Nikolaos Kantounis
 Christos Kapralos
 Julianos Kattinis
 Photios Kontoglou
 Kourouniotis
 Nikolaos Koutouzis
 Andreas Kriezis
 Marios Loizides
 Nikiphoros Lytras
 Nikolaos Lytras
 Tassos Mantzavinos
 Melanthius
 Yiannis Moralis
 Theocharis Mores
 Dimitris Mytaras
 Nicos Nicolaides
 Nikos Nikolaou

O-S
 Ioannis Oikonomou
 Charalambos Pachis
 Panaenus
 Périclès Pantazis
 George Papassavas
 Mina Papatheodorou-Valyraki
 Stass Paraskos
 Parrhasius
 Konstantinos Parthenis
 George Pastakas
 Pausias
 Gerasimos Pitzamanos
 Polyeidos
 Polygnotus
 Yiannis Poulakas
 Georgios Prokopiou
 Protogenes
 Yiannis Psychopedis
 Iakovos Rizos
 Kostas Spiropoulos
 Yiannis Spyropoulos
 Diamantis Stagidis
 Yannis Stavrou

T-Z
 Panayiotis Tetsis
 Theon of Samos
 Theophanes the Greek
 Epameinondas Thomopoulos
 Timarete
 Yannis Tsarouchis
 Periklis Tsirigotis
 Dionysios Tsokos
 Antonio Vassilacchi
 Spyros Vassiliou
 Lydia Venieri
 Konstantinos Volanakis
 Constantin Xenakis
 Nikolaos Xydias Typaldos
 Odysseus Yakoumakis
 Zeuxis

 
Greek